is a Japanese professional footballer who plays as a defender for hometown club, Nara Club.

Club career
On 8 December 2022, Suzuki joined J3 League hometown newly promoted, Nara Club for upcoming 2023 season.

Career statistics

Club 
.

References

External links

1996 births
Living people
Japanese footballers
Association football defenders
Tokushima Vortis players
FC Ryukyu players
Ehime FC players
Nara Club players
J2 League players
J3 League players